Borate nitrates are mixed anion compounds containing separate borate and nitrate anions. They are distinct from the boronitrates where the borate is linked to a nitrate via a common oxygen atom.

List

References

Nitrates
Borates
Mixed anion compounds